The men's light welterweight (63.5 kg/139.7 lbs) K-1 category at the W.A.K.O. World Championships 2007 in Belgrade was the fourth lightest of the K-1 tournaments, involving twelve fighters from four continents (Europe, Asia, Africa and North America).  Each of the matches was three rounds of two minutes each and were fought under K-1 rules.

As there were too few fighters for a sixteen-man tournament, four of the competitors had byes through to the quarter finals.  The tournament gold medallist was the highly decorated Belarusian Andrei Kulebin who won his third W.A.K.O. world championships by defeating Russian Kurbanali Akaev in the final.  Defeated semi finalists, Jose Luis Uribe Garcia from Mexico and Serbian Sreten Miletic, won bronze medals.

Results

See also
List of WAKO Amateur World Championships
List of WAKO Amateur European Championships
List of male kickboxers

References

External links
 WAKO World Association of Kickboxing Organizations Official Site

Kickboxing events at the WAKO World Championships 2007 Belgrade
2007 in kickboxing
Kickboxing in Serbia